Nemanja Belaković (born 8 January 1997) is a Serbian footballer who plays as a winger for Radnički Niš in the Serbian Superliga.

Club career
Born in Kraljevo, Belaković started training football in "Bambi" football academy, and later joined local club Sloga. From 2013 to 2014 he spent in Partizan youth team, and after 2013-14 season he joined the OFK Beograd. He made his professional debut for OFK Beograd in away Serbian SuperLiga match against Red Star Belgrade on 29 November 2014. After season-and-a-half with the Croatian Second Football League side NK Novigrad, Belaković moved to Čukarički at the beginning of 2018.

On 19 July 2021, he joined TSV Hartberg in Austria on a two-year contract.

References

External links
 
 
 
 

1997 births
Living people
Sportspeople from Kraljevo
Association football midfielders
Serbian footballers
NK Novigrad players
OFK Beograd players
FK Čukarički players
FK Spartaks Jūrmala players
TSV Hartberg players
FK Liepāja players
Serbian SuperLiga players
First Football League (Croatia) players
Latvian Higher League players
Austrian Football Bundesliga players
Serbian expatriate footballers
Serbian expatriate sportspeople in Croatia
Expatriate footballers in Croatia
Serbian expatriate sportspeople in Latvia
Expatriate footballers in Latvia
Serbian expatriate sportspeople in Austria
Expatriate footballers in Austria